Pamir Kabul F.C. is a football team in Afghanistan. They play in the Afghan Premier League.

Football clubs in Afghanistan
Sport in Kabul